Montdidier (or ) is a commune in the Somme department in the administrative region of Hauts-de-France (historically Picardy), northern France.

Geography
Montdidier station has rail connections to Amiens and Compiègne.

Population

History

The commune has existed since before Roman times, possibly corresponding to the site of  Bratuspance.

Under Charlemagne, a donjon was built in the north-west of the town, on a chalk promontory, (nowadays the site of the Prieuré). It was here, in 774, that Desiderius, king of the  Lombards, was held prisoner by Charlemagne, giving the town its name (in French, Didier).

Around the year 948, the first church was built near the castle by Heldwide, the wife of Hilduin, first of the house of the Counts of Montdidier

In 1184, King Philip II of France had the outlying buildings of the town burnt down, during the war for the possession of the Amiénois and the Vermandois. In 1195, the town was granted its communal charter.

In 1472, Montdidier was set alight by the Burgundians. Charles the Bold is reported to have said "Such are the fruits of war".

Under the Ancien Régime, Montdidier was in the province of the Santerre (one of eight provinces of Picardy) and the seat of a bailiwick (established in 1516) By edict of 1575, Henry III of France created the élection of Montdidier, granting tax-raising powers to elected representatives.

The year 1590 saw the commune threatened and eventually invaded by the troops of Henry IV of France.

As with many towns of the region, Montdidier bore the brunt of the fighting of World War I. Many of the town's more ancient and valuable monuments were destroyed in that occasion.

Main sights
 Church of Saint-Sépulcre in flamboyant gothic, with six 17th century Reydams tapestries on show in the nave
 Church of St Peter (flamboyant gothic)
 Ruins of Saint-Martin's church
 Statue of Antoine-Augustin Parmentier on Parmentier Place
 The town hall, in the Flemish style and decorated in Art Deco style
 The priory (once known as the Salle du Roy). Rebuilt in 1930, after being damaged during World War I. It has functioned as the Palais de Justice and became the Centre des Impôts in 1965.
 The war memorial
 Monument to the 212 French pilots who lost their lives in Picardy in May and June 1940

Personalities
 Fredegund (c.545–597), Queen of Neustria
 Felicia of Roucy (c.1060–1123), Queen of Aragon
 Gilles de Roye (died 1478), Cistercian monk
 Jean Fernel (1497–1558), physician
 Claude Capperonnier (1671–1744), philosopher
 Jean Capperonnier (1716–1775), philosopher and librarian
 Antoine-Augustin Parmentier (1737–1813), agriculturist
 Jean-Jacques-Antoine Caussin de Perceval (1759–1835), linguist
 Cléon Galoppe d'Onquaire (1805–1867), writer and playwright
 Louis-Lucien Klotz (1868–1930), journalist and politician
 Maurice Blanchard (1890–1960), aeronautic engineer and poet
 Urbain Wallet (1899–1973), footballer
 Jimmy Casper (born 1978), cyclist

See also
Communes of the Somme department
Raymond Couvègnes

References

Bibliography
  Paul Roger, pages 259 à 266 in Tome II de « Histoire des Cathédrales, Abbayes, Châteaux-forts et Villes de la Picardie et de l'Artois », éd. Duval et Herment, Amiens, 1842 (Réimpression Editions La Découvrance, 2003), 352 p. -

External links

 Municipal website 
 A history of Montdidier 
 Website of Hervé Grosjean 
 Old postcards of Montdidier 
 Tourist Office website 

Communes of Somme (department)
Subprefectures in France